Garden Grove is a city in northern Orange County, California, United States. The population was 171,949 at the 2020 census. State Route 22, also known as the Garden Grove Freeway, passes through the city in an east–west direction. The western portion of the city is known as West Garden Grove.

History

19th century
Garden Grove was founded by Alonzo Cook in 1874. A school district and Methodist church were organized that year. It remained a small rural crossroads and farming community until the arrival of the Pacific Electric Railroad in 1905. The rail connection helped the town prosper with the influx of tourists, visitors and eventually settlers, and it was noted for its crops of oranges, walnuts, chili peppers and later strawberries.

20th century
In 1933, much of the town's central business district was destroyed by the Long Beach earthquake, and one person was killed at the high school. The post-World War II boom led to rapid development, and Garden Grove was incorporated as a city in 1956 with about 44,000 residents.

In 1956, Orange County Plaza (now The Promenade) was opened at Chapman and Brookhurst, and upon its expansion in 1959, it had 60 stores, including a J. C. Penney, 2 variety stores and 2 supermarkets, and billed itself as both the largest and the first regional shopping center in Orange County.

Geography
Garden Grove has a rugged set of boundaries with many panhandles. The West Garden Grove neighborhood is west of Beach Boulevard and is largely separated from the rest of Garden Grove by the city of Stanton, with a small bridge of jurisdiction linking the two along Garden Grove Boulevard. A panhandle in the southern part of the town's borders situated between Westminster's Ward Street to the west and Santa Ana's Euclid Street to the east creates a small border with the city of Fountain Valley. Other neighboring cities include Cypress and Anaheim to the north, Orange to the east, and the cities of Seal Beach and Los Alamitos to the west.

Demographics

2010
The 2010 United States Census reported that Garden Grove had a population of 170,883. The racial makeup of Garden Grove was 68,149 (39.9%) White, 2,155 (1.3%) Black, 983 (0.6%) Native American, 63,451 (37.1%) Asian, 1,110 (0.6%) Pacific Islander, 28,916 (16.9%) from other races, and 6,119 (3.6%) from two or more races. Hispanic or Latino of any race were 63,079 persons (36.9%). Non-Hispanic whites were 22.6% of the population, down from 90.6% in 1970. Vietnamese Americans numbered 47,331 of the population. At 27.7% this was the highest concentration of any city in the United States except for adjacent Westminster.

The Census reported that 168,942 people (98.9% of the population) lived in households, 1,234 (0.7%) lived in non-institutionalized group quarters, and 707 (0.4%) were institutionalized.

There were 46,037 households, out of which 21,361 (46.4%) had children under the age of 18 living in them, 26,659 (57.9%) were opposite-sex married couples living together, 6,866 (14.9%) had a female householder with no husband present, 3,588 (7.8%) had a male householder with no wife present.  There were 2,025 (4.4%) unmarried opposite-sex partnerships, and 269 (0.6%) same-sex married couples or partnerships. 6,491 households (14.1%) were made up of individuals, and 2,842 (6.2%) had someone living alone who was 65 years of age or older. The average household size was 3.67.  There were 37,113 families (80.6% of all households); the average family size was 3.94.

The population was spread out, with 43,763 people (25.6%) under the age of 18, 17,383 people (10.2%) aged 18 to 24, 49,105 people (28.7%) aged 25 to 44, 42,106 people (24.6%) aged 45 to 64, and 18,526 people (10.8%) who were 65 years of age or older.  The median age was 35.6 years. For every 100 females, there were 99.6 males.  For every 100 females age 18 and over, there were 7.7 males.

The homeowner vacancy rate was 1.2%; the rental vacancy rate was 4.6%.  96,308 people (56.4% of the population) lived in owner-occupied housing units and 72,634 people (42.5%) lived in rental housing units.

According to the 2010 United States Census, Garden Grove had a median household income of $59,988, with 15.5% of the population living below the federal poverty line.

Economy
According to the city's 2021 Annual Comprehensive Financial Report, the top employers in the city are:

Arts and culture
Garden Grove is home to two stage theaters, the Gem Theater and the Festival Amphitheater. The Festival Amphitheater hosts Shakespeare Orange County, which presents an annual Shakespeare Festival each summer. Both venues are owned by the City of Garden Grove, but operated by outside entities. The Gem Theater is currently operated by Damien Lorton and Nicole Cassesso of 'One More Productions'. The Festival Amphitheater is managed by Thomas Bradac, the producing artistic director of Shakespeare Orange County.

The Garden Grove Playhouse used to be an active theatre, now closed down. It was operated by a non-profit group of the same name.

An annual event held over Memorial Day weekend, the Garden Grove Strawberry Festival is one of the largest community festivals in the western United States, attracting an estimated 250,000 visitors. It began in 1958 and celebrates the city's agricultural past, which includes cultivating crops such as chili peppers, oranges, walnuts and strawberries. Part of the festivities include the cutting of the world's largest strawberry shortcake, carnival rides, food vendors, live music, and a celebrity-filled parade. Numerous Garden Grove organizations, including the Miss Garden Grove Scholarship Program, are part of the Memorial Day weekend festivities every year. In commemoration of Garden Grove's 50th anniversary, the city painted some of its fire hydrants with a design that featured a strawberry, recognizing the festival as a big part of Garden Grove's history.

Government

Local government

Garden Grove uses a council-manager form of government. In July 2015, the city was sued by a resident who claimed that the longstanding at-large elections had affected the Latino vote and was in violation of the California Voting Rights Act. On January 26, 2016, the city council voted to settle the lawsuit, and therefore adopted that council members would be voted by district (six districts total) and no longer at-large; the mayor, however, will continue to be elected at-large. The city council consists of mayor Steve Jones, Phat Bui, George S. Brietigam III, John R. O'Neill, Thu-Ha Nguyen, Stephanie Klopfenstein, and mayor pro tem Kim B. Nguyen. According to the city's most recent Comprehensive Annual Financial Report, the city's various funds had $206.0 million in revenues, $193.0 million in expenditures, $1,098.9 million in total assets, $251.5 million in total liabilities, and $196.3 million in cash and investments.

State and federal representation

Politics
According to the California Secretary of State, as of October 22, 2018, Garden Grove has 72,768 registered voters. Of those, 26,604 (36.56%) are registered Democrats, 21,449 (29.48%) are registered Republicans, and 21,941 (30.15%) have declined to state a political party/are independents.

Although Democrat Kamala Harris easily won California and also won Orange County in the 2016 United States Senate election, Democrat Loretta Sanchez easily won Garden Grove by a 67%-33% margin, her widest margin of victory for any city in Orange County.

Garden Grove, although traditionally Republican in presidential elections, has voted for the Democratic presidential nominee in each of the last three presidential elections. Hillary Rodham Clinton carried the city by a 23-point margin in 2016. In 2020, however, Joe Biden managed to keep the city in the Democratic column by just over a point, largely because of gains Donald J. Trump made in Orange County's Vietnamese community.

Education
The Garden Grove Unified School District serves most of the city, as well as the Westminster School District, Huntington Beach Union High School District, Anaheim Elementary School District, Anaheim Union High School District and the Orange Unified School District, which serves portions in Garden Grove.

King of Kings Lutheran School is a Christian school (3K-8th grade) of the Wisconsin Evangelical Lutheran Synod (WELS) in Garden Grove.

Infrastructure

Emergency services 
The Garden Grove Police Department provides law enforcement, with mutual aid assistance offered at times by the Anaheim Police Department's helicopter and the Orange County Sheriff's Department Air Unit.

In August 2019,  the city of Garden Grove entered into a 10-year contract with the Orange County Fire Authority (OCFA) for fire and rescue services, and merged all existing Garden Grove Fire Department personnel and equipment into the OCFA.

Notable people

Entertainment
 Justin Chon, actor
 Wally George, talk-show host
 Scott Klopfenstein, backup singer, keyboardist, trumpeter and guitarist for the ska-punk band Reel Big Fish
 Dexter Holland, lead singer, The Offspring, also wrote the song "The Kids Aren't Alright" about the city
 Steve Martin, actor, comedian, musician and writer; graduate of Garden Grove High School
 Jennette McCurdy, podcaster, author and actress, iCarly and Sam & Cat
 Monique Powell, lead singer, Save Ferris
 Eunice Pringle, actress, notably who accused movie mogul Alexander Pantages in 1929 of rape
 Kevin 'Noodles' Wasserman, lead guitarist, The Offspring
 Atreyu, a metalcore band
 Kieu Chinh, actress
 Poreotics, dance crew
 Dave Mustaine, lead singer, Megadeth; played baseball in Garden Grove Eastside Little League, lived on Pearce Ave
 Basil "Bill" Poledouris, musician; motion picture film score music composer
 Vicky Nguyen, news reporter, KFYR-TV, NBC Affiliate
 Shubhendra Shankar, musician, composer and graphic artist
 Mick Mars, musician and guitarist for Mötley Crüe
 David J. Peterson, creator of the Dothraki and Valyrian languages from HBO's Game of Thrones

Sports
 Bert Blyleven, Major League Baseball pitcher, Hall of Famer, color commentator, graduate of Santiago High School
 Ed Caruthers, Olympic silver medalist, 1968 Mexico City. Taught at Bolsa Grande High School.
 Bobby Crosby, MLB Rookie of the Year (2004), attended Pacifica High School and La Quinta High School
 Mary Decker, runner in National Track and Field Hall of Fame; grew up in Garden Grove
 Lenny Dykstra, MLB player with Mets, Phillies; graduate of Garden Grove High School
 Amanda Freed, Olympic gold medalist in softball (2004), attended Pacifica High School, Bell Intermediate and Patton Elementary
 Luis Gil, soccer player for Real Salt Lake
 Gary Hall Sr., Olympic swimmer, silver medalist
 Lorrin "Whitey" Harrison, legendary surfer and surfing innovator
 Mike Iupati, football player
 Jeremy Jackson, mixed martial artist
 Norm Johnson, NFL kicker
 Darryl Kile, MLB pitcher
 Leah O'Brien, softball infielder, Olympic gold medalist 1996
 Craig Paquette, MLB third baseman, graduate of Rancho Alamitos High School
 Nam Phan, mixed martial artist
 Troy Polamalu, NFL player with the Pittsburgh Steelers
 Dennis Sigalos, motorcycle speedway rider, winner of the 1982 Speedway World Pairs Championship
 Leo Sutherland, MLB player
 Ed Templeton, professional skateboarder and artist
 Alan Trammell, MLB shortstop and manager for the Detroit Tigers
 Matt Treanor, MLB catcher
 Randy Vataha, football player at Stanford, Jim Plunkett's favorite receiver

Politics
 Jim Silva, former California Assemblyman, former Member of the Orange County Board of Supervisors, former Mayor of Seal Beach
 Bill Thomas, retired U.S. Congressman and former Chairman of the House Ways and Means Committee (and alumnus of Garden Grove High School)
 Robert K. Dornan, former U.S. Congressman.
 Janet Nguyen, Orange County supervisor
 Curt Pringle, former State Assemblyman, Speaker of the California State Assembly and former mayor of Anaheim
 Paul Jeffrey Watford, Judge of the United States Court of Appeals for the Ninth Circuit, Assumed office May 22, 2012, born in Garden Grove August 25, 1967

Others
 Steve Fossett, aviator and adventurer
 Michael A. Monsoor, Navy SEAL, Medal of Honor recipient
 Tibor Rubin, Medal of Honor recipient
 Robert H. Schuller, television evangelist
 Nicole Brown Simpson, murder victim and former wife of O.J. Simpson

Sister cities 
  Anyang, South Korea

See also
Christ Cathedral (Garden Grove, California)
List of U.S. cities with large Hispanic populations

References

External links

 

 
Cities in Orange County, California
Incorporated cities and towns in California
Populated places established in 1874
Populated places on the Santa Ana River
1874 establishments in California